Barville-en-Gâtinais (literally Barville in Gâtinais) is a commune in the Loiret department in north-central France.

History
The commune was known as Barville until 1919, when its name was changed to the current Barville-en-Gâtinais.

Population

See also
Communes of the Loiret department

References

Communes of Loiret